Paper Faces are British electronic music producers Adam Blake and Stuart Price. They have remixed tracks for their band Zoot Woman as well as other established recording artists such as Madonna, Scissor Sisters, Armand Van Helden, Chromeo and Frankmusik.

Remixography

External links
Paper Faces on Myspace
Paper Faces on Discogs

Remixography

English electronic music duos
Male musical duos
Musical groups established in 2001
Musical groups from Reading, Berkshire
2001 establishments in the United Kingdom
Remixers